Kamień (Polish for "stone") may refer to:

Places
Kamień Pomorski, a town in West Pomeranian Voivodeship (NW Poland), seat of Kamień County
Kamień Krajeński, a town in Kuyavian-Pomeranian Voivodeship (north-central Poland)
Kamień, Lwówek Śląski County in Lower Silesian Voivodeship (south-west Poland)
Kamień, Oleśnica County in Lower Silesian Voivodeship (south-west Poland)
Kamień, Wrocław County in Lower Silesian Voivodeship (south-west Poland)
Kamień, Kuyavian-Pomeranian Voivodeship (north-central Poland)
Kamień, Chełm County in Lublin Voivodeship (east Poland)
Kamień, Augustów County in Podlaskie Voivodeship (north-east Poland)
Kamień, Hajnówka County in Podlaskie Voivodeship (north-east Poland)
Kamień, Bełchatów County in Łódź Voivodeship (central Poland)
Kamień, Brzeziny County in Łódź Voivodeship (central Poland)
Kamień, Opoczno County in Łódź Voivodeship (central Poland)
Kamień, Zgierz County in Łódź Voivodeship (central Poland)
Kamień, Łuków County in Lublin Voivodeship (east Poland)
Kamień, Opole Lubelskie County in Lublin Voivodeship (east Poland)
Kamień, Lesser Poland Voivodeship (south Poland)
Kamień, Włodawa County in Lublin Voivodeship (east Poland)
Kamień, Subcarpathian Voivodeship (south-east Poland)
Kamień, Białobrzegi County in Masovian Voivodeship (east-central Poland)
Kamień, Mława County in Masovian Voivodeship (east-central Poland)
Kamień, Jarocin County in Greater Poland Voivodeship (west-central Poland)
Kamień, Kalisz County in Greater Poland Voivodeship (west-central Poland)
Kamień, Koło County in Greater Poland Voivodeship (west-central Poland)
Kamień, Słupca County in Greater Poland Voivodeship (west-central Poland)
Kamień, Września County in Greater Poland Voivodeship (west-central Poland)
Kamień, Złotów County in Greater Poland Voivodeship (west-central Poland)
Kamień, Lubusz Voivodeship (west Poland)
Kamień, Człuchów County in Pomeranian Voivodeship (north Poland)
Kamień, Wejherowo County in Pomeranian Voivodeship (north Poland)
Kamień, Iława County in Warmian-Masurian Voivodeship (north Poland)
Kamień, Kętrzyn County in Warmian-Masurian Voivodeship (north Poland)
Kamień, Pisz County in Warmian-Masurian Voivodeship (north Poland)
Kamień, Węgorzewo County in Warmian-Masurian Voivodeship (north Poland)
Kamień, Rybnik in Silesian Voivodeship (south Poland)

Other uses
Roger Kamien (born 1934), Israeli musicologist
DZihan & Kamien, a jazz music duo based in Austria
Kamień (album), 1995 album by Polish singer Kayah

See also

Karien